Burton Joyce railway station serves the village of Burton Joyce in Nottinghamshire, England. It lies between Carlton and Lowdham stations on the Nottingham to Lincoln Line.

History
The builders of the railway faced a good deal of opposition at Burton Joyce which resulted in the station being outside of the village. The preferred site of the railway company was near to the Lord Nelson inn, but the innkeeper objected on the grounds that he would have to brew more beer. The vicar of St Helen's Church, Burton Joyce, Revd. John Rolleston, near whose vicarage the line was to run, objected to the railway on account of the noise. Finally the promoters of the railway bought him out and built a new vicarage for him.

The line was engineered by George Stephenson and opened by the Midland Railway on 3 August 1846. The contractors for the line were Craven and Son of Newark and Nottingham

The Nottingham (westbound) platform was shortened significantly when locomotive-hauled trains stopped in the 1960s, during the Beeching era. The main fleet through the station is class 153s and 156s, and sometimes 158s.

Stationmasters

Joseph Peel ca. 1859 - 1877
Charles Jobbins 1877 - 1879 (afterwards station master at Coaley Junction)
William Allen 1879 - 1884
W. Whatley 1884 - 1886
William Henry Payne 1886 - 1892 (formerly station master at Tonge and Breedon)
F. Porter 1892 - 1895 (afterwards station master at East Langton)
Frederick Mason 1895 - 1899 (afterwards station master at Mansfield Woodhouse)
Sidney W. Varnam 1899 - 1903 (afterwards station master at Old Dalby)
E.H. Allen 1903 - 1906
H.D.D. Hinton 1906 - 1908
George Calow 1908 - ca. 1911 (formerly station master at Watnall)
G. Dewey ca. 1914
A.R. Powell from 1938

Facilities and Services
The station has two platforms, a five-space car park, a help point and shelters on both platforms. East Midlands Railway serve this station with trains between Newark Castle and Matlock via Nottingham. Trains call every two hours each way throughout the day (with extras at peak times). These mostly run between Newark Castle and Matlock via Derby, but some Lincoln to Nottingham and Leicester trains also call at peak times and in the evenings. On Sundays, trains now run every two hours all day rather than from mid-afternoon onwards as they did prior to the May 2017 timetable change; these run between Lincoln and Nottingham only.

External links

References

Railway stations in Nottinghamshire
DfT Category F2 stations
Former Midland Railway stations
Railway stations in Great Britain opened in 1846
Railway stations served by East Midlands Railway
1846 establishments in England
Burton Joyce